Rapa Nui Point is a rocky point projecting 180 m westwards into Shirreff Cove from the west coast of the small (2.6 km by 1.6 km) ice-free promontory forming the north extremity of Ioannes Paulus II Peninsula, western Livingston Island in the South Shetland Islands, Antarctica and ending up in Cape Shirreff.  The point is dominated by Scarborough Castle, a 35 m crag roughly charted and descriptively named by the British sealer Captain Robert Fildes in 1821.

The feature is named descriptively from its resemblance to the moai figures of Easter Island (Rapa Nui), Chile.

Location

Maps
 Map 3. Cape Shirreff, ASPA No. 149: Breeding wildlife sites and human features. Punta Arenas: Instituto Antártico Chileno (INACH), 2004.
 L.L. Ivanov et al. Antarctica: Livingston Island and Greenwich Island, South Shetland Islands. Scale 1:100000 topographic map. Sofia: Antarctic Place-names Commission of Bulgaria, 2005.
 L.L. Ivanov. Antarctica: Livingston Island and Greenwich, Robert, Snow and Smith Islands. Scale 1:120000 topographic map. Troyan: Manfred Wörner Foundation, 2009.

References
 SCAR Composite Antarctic Gazetteer.

Headlands of Livingston Island